The Statesmen Quartet (also known as Hovie Lister and The Statesmen Quartet) were an American southern gospel quartet founded in 1948 by Baptist Minister Hovie Lister. Along with the Blackwood Brothers, the Statesmen Quartet were considered the most successful and influential gospel quartet of the 1950s and 1960s and had a wide influence on artists during that time from the gospel, country, pop, and rock and roll genre. Along with hits spanning many decades, The Statesmen Quartet had many notable successes including being the first Gospel group to receive endorsement deals. Additionally, they made television commercials, appeared on numerous radio and TV shows, and were signed to RCA Victor before launching their own record label, Skylite Records, with The Blackwood Brothers.

Formation (1948)
The Statesmen Quartet was founded in 1948 in Atlanta, Georgia, by Hovie Lister, a Baptist minister and convention-style piano player. Lister constructed the quartet as a hand-picked group of the best singing voices in order to secure a prime time-slot on the new WCON radio station. The initial line-up included Bobby Strickland singing tenor, Mosie Lister singing lead, Bervin Kendrick singing baritone, and Gordon Hill singing bass. The group's name was lifted from the title of a newsletter published by Herman Talmadge, Governor of Georgia, with Talmadge's permission. The quartet made their debut on WCON in Atlanta in October, 1948.

Broadcasting & recording (1948-1952)
After having several radio programs in the Atlanta, Georgia, area, The Statesmen "became the first Southern gospel quartet to have a nationally syndicated TV program, Singing Time in Dixie, sponsored by Nabisco." The group recorded 36 songs for Capitol Records from 1949 to 1953. They switched to RCA Victor in 1954, recording more than 30 albums during their years with that company. In 1968, they began recording for Skylite. Though most fans were inclined to support the group in terms of religious inspiration and/or entertainment, a 1964 profile of the group in Billboard magazine noted, "The Statesmen ... are known as a complex organization to the music industry." In addition to the broadcasting and recording activities already mentioned, the article cited ownership of four gospel music publishing companies that "print and distribute song books and sheet music."

Pinnacle years (1953-1957)
In 1952, The Statesmen Quartet entered into a business partnership with The Blackwood Brothers Quartet. The "Stateswood" team would dominate Southern Gospel music for the next two decades. Lister's vision of the premiere lineup came to fruition by adding Jake Hess on lead in 1948, James "Big Chief" Wetherington as bass in 1949, Doy Ott as baritone in 1951, and finally with Denver Crumpler as tenor in 1953, with Lister on piano and master of ceremonies. During the next years, The Statesmen Quartet achieved fame as one of the premiere groups of both Southern gospel and quartet music. With this lineup, The Statesmen began recording for RCA Victor and began starring in the Nabisco Hour national TV show as mentioned above. Popular songs of this period include "Get Away Jordan" and "Happy Rhythm". As early as 1950, The Statesmen used the phrase "Rockin' and rollin'" in a song, and Hovie Lister's frantic boogie-woogie piano, piano bench acrobatics, and hair shaken down in his eyes would have great influence on early rock and roll artists, particularly on Jerry Lee Lewis, who was a fan of gospel music and the Statesmen. On July 4, 1955, the Blackwood/Statesmen team traveled to Texas for an engagement that would feature several secular artists on the same program. Among them was Elvis Presley. Elvis was planning to sing his rock hits, but refrained out of respect of his gospel idols. The Statesmen exerted a powerful influence on young Elvis, who idolized and imitated Jake Hess' vocal styling and Wetherington's movements and gyrations on stage. In an interview with songwriter Bill Gaither, Hess remembered seeing young Elvis coming to Statesmen shows in Tupelo when Presley was only nine or ten. Hess said that the serious young Elvis would ask him, "How do you make a record?" or "How many suits you got?" On the Gaither Homecoming video "Oh My Glory", Hess recalls Presley attending Statesmen concerts and being invited up onstage to sing lead in his place on a couple of handpicked numbers. Phillip Goff, in The Blackwell Companion to Religion in America, provided a description of how The Statesmen began one live appearance. "Greeted by thunderous applause, the announcer approaches the microphone: "You're listening to the original Wally Fowler All Night Singing, November the sixth, right here in Nashville, Tennessee, nineteen hundred fifty-nine. This is the eleventh anniversary and the greatest crowd that's ever assembled for any program in the Ryman Auditorium is here tonight for the all night sing." Goff's description related but one aspect of The Statesmen's showmanship. Francis Edward Abernathy wrote about lasting changes that the group introduced to the world of gospel quartets: The Statesmen Quartet added flourishes which entertained new audiences -- exuberant singing, arm waving, hand clapping, and electrifying performances. This was alien behavior for traditional convention quartets. But the new behavior attracted interest. The Statesmen became so popular that subsequent gospel quartets imitated their style.

Rosie Rozell era (1958-1973)
In 1957, Crumpler died after seeking medical attention for what was at the time diagnosed as a heart condition, but was revealed to be diabetic shock. Former tenor Cat Freeman came back briefly, but was replaced in 1958 by former Oklahoma police officer Roland "Rosie" Rozell. The Rozell-Hess-Ott-Wetherington lineup recorded such classics as "Faith Unlocks The Door" and Rozell's signature songs "Oh What A Savior" and "There's Room at the Cross," both songs becoming gospel music mainstays for decades after. In 1963, Hess left The Statesmen to form his own quartet, Jake Hess and The Imperials. Lister recruited Jack Toney to replace Hess. Before long, Toney's powerful voice helped The Statesmen to press on and continue with their success. Another setback occurred when Wetherington died suddenly of early heart disease on October 3, 1973, while attending the National Quartet Convention in Nashville. It was around this time that the group was losing stability on its own and more changes to the line-up were inevitable.

Later years (1974-2001)
Later incarnations of The Statesmen would include tenors Sherrill "Shaun" Nielson, Willie Wynn, and Johnny Cook; lead singers Roy McNeil and Jim Hill; baritones Chris Hess, Biney English and Rick Fair; and bass singers Ray Burdett, Bob Caldwell and Doug Young. Over the years, Jake Hess, Jack Toney, Doy Ott and Rosie Rozell would rejoin The Statesmen at various times, most notably a couple years after Wetherington's death when Lister brought back Rozell, Hess, and Ott as "The Statesmen" sans bass. A comical pairing of this classic Statesmen "trio" with longtime Blackwood Brothers/Stamps Quartet bass singer J.D. Sumner at the 1977 National Quartet Convention in Nashville was the birth of the Masters V, which would include Rosie Rozell, Jake Hess, and Hovie Lister in its lineup. The Statesmen would continue to travel with rotating lineups through 1981, and began to tour again from 1992 to 2001, until Lister's health failed.

Doy Ott was the first of the original group that had survived Crumpler and Wetherington to die, having suffered a cerebral hemorrhage in 1982 that left him comatose, although he did not die until four years later. Rozell died on February 28, 1995, at the age of 66; Lister died on December 27, 2001, at the age of 75 due to complications of lymphoma, and Hess succumbed to a long battle with heart disease on January 4, 2004, at the age of 76.

Legacy and cultural impact
The Statesmen influenced both gospel and non-gospel artists alike. Elvis Presley was a fan of the group growing up and wanted to emulate them in his career and got the chance to perform with them. Jerry Lee Lewis also had a strong admiration for the group, but most notably Lister and his piano playing. "The Killer", as Lewis was called, credited Lister and the Statesman for developing his own style in performance. Carl Perkins and Larry Gatlin also cited themselves as fans of the group, while Tammy Wynette said on numerous occasions that Tenor Denver Crumpler was her "favorite singer, ever." The group's appeal to early rock and roll fans also pre-dated the "rock around the clock" era and also had an influence on early Contemporary Christian Music.

In his book They Heard Georgia Singing, former Georgia Governor and Senator Zell Miller said that Lister and his group "more than anyone else, put style and flair into gospel music. ... Hovie was first of all a minister, and he ministered with his music,"
said Sen. Miller. "But he used to say religion did not need to have a long face, and he made religion upbeat." Lister defended his musical style that was considered "worldly" by many churches by retorting "If it takes shaking my hair down, beating a piano like Liberace or Piano Red to keep these young people out of beer joints or the rear seats of automobiles, I'll do it. The devil's got his kind of entertainment. We've got ours."

The group was elected into the Gospel Music Hall of Fame in 1998 and the Southern Gospel Music Hall of Fame the previous year in 1997. The group permanently folded and retired in 2002.

Members

Line-ups

Grand Ole Gospel Reunion Statesmen Members

Grand Ole Gospel Reunion Quartet

Pianist
Hovie Lister (1948–2001, owner)
Boyce Hawkins (1951) (filled in for Hovie Lister)
Doy Ott (1951) (filled in for Hovie Lister)

Tenor
Bobby Strickland (1948–1951)
Earl Terry (1951)
Claris Freeman (1951–1953, 1957–1958) (died March 21, 1989; aged 67)
Denver Crumpler (1953–1957) (died March 21, 1957; aged 44)
Rosie Rozell (1958–1969, 1973, 1978, 1977–1981) (died February 28, 1995; aged 66)
Shaun Neilsen (1969–1973, 1975)
Willie Wynn (1973–1974)
Wayne Hilton (1974–1975)
Johnny Cook (1992–1993) (died May 14, 2000; aged 51)
Tank Tackett (1993)
Steve Warren (1994)
Gene Miller (1994)
Wallace Nelms (1994–2001)

Lead
Mosie Lister (1948) (died February 12, 2015; aged 93)
Jake Hess (1948–1963, 1975, 1977–1979, 1988, 1992–1993) (died January 4, 2004; aged 76)
Gary McSpadden (1960) (filled in for Jake Hess) (died April 15, 2020; aged 77)
Les Roberson (1953) (also filled in for Jake Hess)
Jack Toney (1963–1966, 1967–1968, 1979, 1994–2001) (died April 15, 2004; aged 70)
Roy McNeal (1966–1967)
Jim Hill (1968–1971)
Gary Timbs (1971–1973)
Elmer Cole (1973–1974)
David Will (1975)
Buddy Burton (1979–1981, 1993–1994)
Wayne Little (1993)

Baritone
Bervin Kendrick (1948–1951)
Troy Posey (1951)
Doy Ott (1951–1978) (died November 6, 1986; aged 67)
Chris Hess (1978–1979)
Ed Hill (1979–1980) (died July 13, 2020)
Richard Coletrane (1981)
Buddy Burton (1988, 1993)
Biney English (1992–1993)
Scooter Simmons (1993)
Jerry Candler (1993–1994)
Mike Loprinzi (1994–1998)
Rick Fair (1998–2001)

Bass
Gordon Hill (1948)
A.D. Soward (1949)
Jim Wetherington (1949–1973) (died October 3, 1973; aged 50)
Ray Burdett (1973–1975)
Tommy Thompson (1979–1980, 1988)
J. D. Sumner (1981) (died November 16, 1998; aged 73)
Larry Strickland (1988)
Bob Caldwell (1992–1993)
Hovie Walker (1993)
Stacy Bragg (1993)
Nic Val (1987–1988, 1991, 1993)
Roy Pauley (1993)
Doug Young (1994–2001)

Discography

1957: The Statesmen Quartet with Hovie Lister
1958: The Statesmen Quartet Sings with Hovie Lister
1958: The Bible Told Me So (RCA)
1959: Hymns
1959: I'll Meet You By the River (RCA)
1959: Get Away Jordan
1960: Mansion Over the Hilltop (RCA)
1960: On Stage (RCA)
1960: Something To Shout About
1960: Encores
1960: Peace, O Lord
1960: Statesmen Blackwood Favorites
1961: Out West (RCA)
1961: Through the States (RCA)
1962: Stop, Look & Listen for the Lord
1962: Camp-Meeting Hymns (RCA)
1962: Singing Time in Dixie (Skylight)
1963: The Mystery of His Way (RCA)
1963: Message in the Sky (RCA Camden)
1963: A Gospel Concert
1964: Hovie Lister Sings with His Famous Statesmen Qt. (RCA)
1964: Hovie Lister Spotlights Doy Ott (RCA)
1964: Songs Of Faith (RCA Camden)
1965: The Best Of The Statesmen Quartet (RCA)
1964: Doris Akers & The Statesmen Sing for You
1965: The Sensational Statesmen Quartet (RCA)
1965: Sings the Golden Gospel Songs (RCA)
1965: All Day Sing & Dinner on the Ground
1966: The Happy Sound (RCA)
1966: Sings the Gospel Gems
1967: In Gospel Country (RCA)
1967: My God is Real (RCA Camden)
1967: Showers of Blessing (RCA)
1968: Sing Brother Sing (RCA)
1968: Hits of the Decade
1968: Happy Land
1968: The Best of the Statesmen Volume 2 (RCA)
1968: God Loves American People (Skylite)
1968: Standing on the Promises
1969: Taller Than Trees (RCA Camden)
1969: Thanks to Calvary (Skylite)
1969: New Sounds Today (Skylite)
1970: No Greater Love (RCA Camden)
1970: Featuring…
1970: The Common Man
1971: Put Your Hand in the Hand (Skylite)
1972: Keep On Smiling
1972: Hits of the Decade
1972: Hits of the Decade Vol. 2 (Chime, Artistic)
1972: They That Sow (Skylite)
1973: I Believe in Jesus
1973: In Memory Of "Big Chief" Jim Wetherington & Denver "Crump" Crumpler (Lord, I Want to Go to Heaven) (CAM)
1973: Time to Remember
1974: Ain't That What It's All About
1974: Precious Memories
1974: Feature Doy Ott
1977: The Legendary Statesmen Return
1977: Gospel Songs Elvis Loved
1977: Get Away Jordan
1978: His Love Put a Song in My Heart
1978: Oh What a Savior (Skylite)
1979: Gospel Gems (Skylite)
1979: Hovie Lister & The Sensational Statesmen
1980: He is Here (Skylite)
1981: Sweet Beulah Land
1992: I Surrender All
1992: The Bible Told Me So
1992: Get Away Jordan
1992: Jubilee’s A Coming
1992: Revival
1992: O What a Savior
1993: O My Lord What a Time
1996: Saints Don't You Know
1997: Hovie Lister & The Statesmen
1998: Still Sensational
1999: You Can't Shake the Rock
2000: Even So Come
Unknown Year Precious Old Book (Temple)
Unknown Year Faith Unlocks the Door (Temple)
Unknown Year How Great Thou Art (Skylite)

References

External links
Grand Ole Gospel Reunion
Statesmen Photo

American gospel musical groups
Gospel quartets
Musical groups established in 1948
RCA Victor artists
Southern gospel performers